Ludovic Clemente Garcés (born May 9, 1986) is an Andorran footballer who plays as a midfielder for the Andorra national team.

References

1986 births
Living people
Andorran footballers
Andorran expatriate sportspeople in Spain
Andorra international footballers
FC Andorra players
Andorran expatriate footballers
Expatriate footballers in Spain
CE Manresa players
Association football midfielders